Lee Jang-soo (born 5 April 1960) is a South Korean television director and producer. He is the founder of the production company Logos Film.

Experience
 Drama director for SBS and MBC
 Freelance Director for TV Series and Film
 Director and Producer of Logos Film

Awards
 2017 10th Korea Drama Awards, Best Producer「Good Manager」
 2017 Broadcast Promotion Merit Award, Presidential Citation
 2014 50th Baeksang Arts Awards, Best TV Drama Series「Good Doctor」
 2012 5th Korea Drama Awards, Best TV Drama Series「My Husband got a Family」
 2011 Commendation from the minister of Culture, Sports and Tourism
 2004 2nd Andre Kim Best Star Awards「Stairway to Heaven」 
 2002 SBS Evaluation Award (The Second Half of the Year), Best TV Show「Shooting a Star」
 2001 SBS Evaluation Award (The First Half of the Year), Best TV Show「Beautiful Days」
 1998 34th Baeksang Arts Awards, Best Director for TV Series「Sae Ki」
 1998 34th Baeksang Arts Awards, Grand Prix for TV Series「Sae Ki」
 1997 30th World Fest Houston Gold Award for「Beef Soup」
 1996 The New York Festival Finalist Award for「Beef Soup」
 1995 28th World Fest Houston Merit-Finalist for 「Light the Candles」
 1993 SBS Evaluation Award (The Fourth Quarter), Best Director「Light the Candles」
 1992 SBS Evaluation Award (Second quarter), Best Director「Marigold Flower」
 1990 MBC Evaluation Award (The Third Quarter), Best TV Show「The Woman」 
 1988 Korean Lyric Awards, Beautiful Lyric Award for 「The Child」

Works

As director

Television
 Love Windmill (SBS, 1991)
 Blue Thread, Red Thread (SBS, 1992)
 Marigold Flower (SBS, 1992)
 Desire on the Sand (SBS, 1992)
 The Thing Called Love (SBS, 1993)
 Light the Candles (SBS, 1993)
 There Goes the Tokebi (SBS, 1994)
 Asphalt Man (SBS, 1995)
 Beef Soup (SBS, 1996)
 Beautiful Lady (SBS, 1997)
 Longing (SBS, 1997)
 Sae Ki (SBS, 1997)
 Love You, Love you (SBS, 1998)
 Beautiful Days (SBS, 2001)
 Shooting a Star (SBS, 2002)
 Stairway to Heaven (SBS, 2003)
 Love Story in Harvard (SBS, 2004)
 Tree of Heaven (SBS, 2006)
 The Relation of Face, Mind and Love (SBS/TV Asahi, 2010)
 Paradise (SBS, 2009)
 Road No. 1 (MBC, 2010)

Film
 Love (1999)

As writer

Book
 I Want to Live for 20 Years (with Kim Chang-wan) (1990)
 If You Hated Someone, You Actually Loved the One (2014)

As producer
 Screen (SBS, 2003)
 Stairway to Heaven (SBS, 2003)
 Save Your Last Dance For Me (SBS, 2004)
 Love Story in Harvard (SBS, 2004)
 Summer Beach (SBS, 2005)
 Miracle of Love (SBS, 2005)
 Heaven's Tree (SBS, 2006)
 The Daring Sisters (MBC, 2006)
 Last Scandal (MBC, 2008)
 Little Mom Scandal (Channel CGV, 2008)
 Smile, Dearies! (SBS, 2009)
 Road No. 1 (MBC, 2010)
 Listen to My Heart (MBC, 2011)
 Heavenly Garden 'Gombaeryoung''' (Channel A)
 Color of Woman (Channel A)
 Come, Come, Absolutely Come (MBN, 2011)
 My Husband Got a Family (KBS, 2012)
 Happy Ending (JTBC, 2012)
 Good Doctor (KBS, 2013)
 Her Legend (JTBC, 2013)
 Feel-Good Day (SBS, 2014)
 Remember – War of the Son (SBS, 2015)
 My Fair Lady (KBS, 2016)
 Good Manager (KBS, 2017)
 Cross (tvN, 2018)
 Lawless Lawyer (tvN, 2018)
 Catch the Ghost (tvN, 2019)
 Vincenzo''

Personal life
Lee is a practicing Christian. As seen in Logos Film's SaraminHR profile, the reason of its foundation in 2000 was to produce just Christianity-related content.

References

External links
 Lee Jang-soo at Logos Film
 
 

1960 births
Living people
South Korean television directors
South Korean film directors
South Korean television producers
South Korean Christians
Inha University alumni
Grand Prize Paeksang Arts Award (television) winners